Sorcery is an American hard rock band from Hollywood, California, United States.

Background
Sorcery is a musical theatrical group from Los Angeles formed in 1975 by guitarist Richard "Smokey' Taylor, bassist Richie King and vocalist Greg Magie. Known for their music and elaborate stage show consisting of a hard rock band and two master magicians who incorporated the use of magic illusions in the on-stage battle where Merlin takes on Satan.

Sorcery also appeared on Dick Clark TV specials. In 1982, they appeared on Dick Clark's 90-minute TV special, A Rockin Halloween. Other artists on this show included Devo, Eddie Money, Jermaine Jackson, and Tony Basil and hosted by Fred Travalena. In 1983 they again appeared on Dick Clark's Halloween TV special, "A Magical Musical Halloween" along with Kim Carnes, INXS, Sparks, Billy Joel, and Jeffrey Osborne. Hosted by master magician Harry Blackstone Jr. They also provided the bumper music for both specials.

In the summer of 1983, while they were recording and filming the Dick Clark special, Morris, Taylor, and King were signed to do the "Rocktober Blood" movie project with filming and recording to start in September 1983. They would have on-screen parts playing the part of the fictitious "Headmistress" band and also provide the "A" side of the film's soundtrack album. They were members of S.A.G., (Screen Actors Guild,) AFTRA (American Federation of Television and Radio Artists), and the American Federation of Musicians, (AFM/AFofM) in Hollywood, California.

History

1976–1980
The band played at the Hollywood (Los Angeles) clubs Whisky a Go Go and the Starwood during 1976 and 1977. They headlined every one of those shows. They only played 6 to 8 shows between 1976–77. After a 1977 show at the Starwood club in Hollywood, they were approached by William Nelson, from "Orr Management", and presented with a management offer with his company. They signed with his company, Orr Management in June 1977.

In September 1977, Arnie Frank, from the Jon Peters agency in Beverly Hills CA., called Sorcery's manager, William Nelson, regarding a movie project he was working on, ultimately entitled Stunt Rock. The executive producer for the film was Herman Ilmer, from the Bassart-Group in Holland, and it was produced by U.S. movie producer, Martin Fink. The deal was for the band to appear in the picture, and provided the movie's soundtrack. The film was being directed by Australian director, Brian Trenchard-Smith, and it starred Australian Stuntman Grant Page and the Dutch actress Monique van de Ven. The band would have a co-starring role as well. The picture was shot in Los Angeles in early 1978. The soundtrack album was recorded at the Warner Bros. Burbank studio's in March 1978 and produced by Jimmy Haskell. The film was released in Europe in the Fall of 1978. For the U.S. and Canadian markets, Allied Artists bought the distribution rights. Three months prior to the release date, Allied filed Bankruptcy in New York. The distribution rights for the picture were then placed in 1980, with Film Ventures International who released the picture in the U.S. and Canadian markets.

1981
In 1981, Sorcery was signed to its second Management contract with Al Anthony. Anthony, immediately booked them in Las Vegas, with "Starwood Productions", owner Beryl Cohen, to headline at the "Aladdin Theater for the Performing Arts", in Las Vegas for an October 31, Halloween Concert. That show was also co-hosted by a local Rock Radio station, "KENO FM-92". With the help of FM-92 radio station promotion, and local television ads, that concert sold-out in a matter of hours. After selling out the first show, Sorcery was asked to headline a second show the following weekend.

1982
In 1982, Sorcery releases the "Sorcery 2" album. Perry is contacted by the Dick Clark company's producer, Larry Klein, who signs Sorcery to appear on a 90-minute Dick Clark Halloween TV special, A Rocking Halloween. Other artists on this show were Billy Joel, DEVO, Jermaine Jackson, Toni Basil, William Shatner, and host Fred Travalena.

1983
In 1983, Sorcery was asked back to do Dick Clark's second-anniversary Halloween TV special, A Magical Musical Halloween. This show featured, Sorcery, INXS, Jeffrey Osborne, Sparks, Eddie Money, and Kim Carnes. Hosted by master magician, Harry Blackstone Jr.
 
In the summer of 1983, Perry meets with Rocktober Blood movie producers, Ferd and Beverly Sabastian. The results of that meeting, Sorcery band members, Richard Taylor, Richie King and Perry Morris sign with "Sebastian Productions", to do the motion picture, Rocktober Blood. They would play the part of the fictitious "Headmistress band" in the film. They also would provide the "A" side of the film's soundtrack album. The Rocktober Blood movie soundtrack album was recorded in part at the "Baby-O" studios on Sunset Blvd. in Hollywood, California.

1984
The movie Rocktober Blood soundtrack album and movie released.

2000
Sorcery Live album is released.

2009
Code Red releases new DVD of the film Stunt Rock. A two-disc set includes interviews with the film's producer Martin Fink, Director, Brian Trenchard-Smith and Sorcery band members, Richard Taylor and Perry Morris.

2015-2016
 October 2015 Sorcery music, "Talking to the Devil" from their 1978 Stunt Rock soundtrack album, is placed in Eli Roth's film Knock Knock.
 September 2016 Rocktober Blood movie and soundtrack are re-released on Lunaris Records.

2017
 January 2017 Stunt Rock movie.

2018
 March 2018. Movie Death Wish. Sorcery's track, "Sacrifice" (From their 1978/Stunt Rock movie soundtrack LP) is placed in film's garage scene.

Directed by Eli Roth, starring Bruce Willis. Distributed by MGM.

2021
 Sorcery members Taylor, Magie and King sign a Recording Contract with RidingEasy Records to reissue the original Stunt Rock soundtrack album. The digital release will be in the summer of 2022. The vinyl release will be in early 2023 and will be an authentic reissue right down to the bi-fold album cover.

Members

Current
 Richard "Smokey" Taylor – Guitar, Keyboards (1975–1987, 2021–present)
 Greg Magie – Vocals (1975–1979, 1982–1987, 2021-present)
 Richie King – Bass (1975–1987, 2021–present)

Former
 Perry (Pere') Morris – Drums (1976–1987)
 David Glen Eisley – Vocals (1980–1982)

Guest musicians
Joe Porcaro – Percussion (Stunt Rock LP 1978)
Doug Loch – Keyboards (1978)
Steve Hendren – Keyboards (1982)
Lon Cohen – Guitar (1983)

Magicians
Paul Haynes played Merlin
Curtis James Hyde played Satan

Discography
 Stunt Rock: Movie Soundtrack (1978)
 Sorcery 2 (1982)
 Rocktober Blood (Band appears in film and on the soundtrack) (1984)
 Sorcery Live (2000)
 Retrospect (2015)
 Stunt Rock: Movie Soundtrack reissue (2022)

Filmography
 Stunt Rock (1978) Starring Grant Page, Sorcery
 Rocktober Blood (1984)
 Knock Knock (2015)
 Death Wish (2018)

Band members history
Sorcery's guitarist, Smokey Huff, (AKA Richard "Smokey" Taylor) is from Dallas, Texas. Huff relocated to Los Angeles in his early twenties to pursue his career in music. He played with members of Frank Zappa's Mothers of Invention, Rare Earth, Vanilla Fudge, Legs Diamond, Nazz and many others before starting Sorcery. Besides playing guitar for the band, he also played keyboards on their albums. He and lead singer Greg MaGee were the primary songwriters for the band. Although he had a vast collection of guitars, Huff preferred playing his Gibson Les Paul for the first two years with the band, and then built a custom Stratocaster that he used for Sorcery's studio work. Huff was endorsed by Hamer Guitars, Mosrite Guitars, Ampeg Amps, Travis Bean Guitars and B.C.Rich Guitars. He still actively records and has current music and videos online.

The first and current lead vocalist for Sorcery is Greg Magie, who was in the band from 1975 until 1979. Magie appears in the film Stunt Rock and on the movie soundtrack LP. Magie rejoined Sorcery in 1982 and stayed with them for the remainder of their duration through 1987. Before Sorcery Magie was the lead vocalist in Sudden Death and Legs Diamond.

Sorcery's drummer Perry (Pere') Morris, was from Sherman Oaks, California. He played on all of Sorcery's albums. He was an AFTRA, SAG, and Local 47 Musicians Union member in Hollywood California. Morris was working as an "In-House" studio musician at Universal Studio's, when Sorcery members Taylor, King and Magee asked him to join the band. Morris also handled the business for the band. Utilizing his business background and industry contacts, he booked all the Hollywood "Whiskey", "Roxy" and "Starwood" shows for the band. Morris then secured a Management Company for the Sorcery group, with William Nelson, owner of "ORR" management, in Beverly Hills. William Nelson obtained the Stunt Rock movie and record deal for the band. Morris booked the band for the two Dick Clark TV special shows (1982 and 1983) for Sorcery, and in 1983 he made the Rocktober Blood movie deal for the band. Morris died in March 2020.

Sorcery's bass player Richie King, is from Sherman Oaks. King played on all the Sorcery albums. King connected with both Huff and Magie in August 1975. After playing several gigs it was clear Sorcery needed a new drummer. That was when King suggested Morris to Huff and Magie and, by the end of 1975, Morris was in the band. Starting fresh in 1976 Sorcery was now complete. King played early Pre CBS Fender Precision bass guitar in the studio and on stage. King's stage amp set up was two Early Ampeg SVT amps, with 16X10" speakers, 2X15" speakers and 2X18" speakers. He was later endorsed by B.C. Rich guitar company. The B.C. Rich guitar company made the first custom built Stealth bass guitar (featured on the cover of Vintage Guitar magazine, see November 2008) in King's honor, as they were fans of his bass playing and Sorcery.

Sorcery band members Taylor, King and Morris also appear in the 1984 film Rocktober Blood as the "Headmistress" Band. They also are the musicians that wrote and recorded the majority of that film's soundtrack LP in 1984.

References

External links 

Stunt Rock Film at IMDb
Rocktober Blood at IMDb

Rock music groups from California